V 804 Skolpenbank was a German fishing trawler which was requisitioned by the Kriegsmarine for service as a Vorpostenboot during World War II.

History 
Skolpenbank was built in Bremen by Deutsche Schiff- und Maschinenbau in 1930. It was requisitioned by the Kriegsmarine in 1939.

Skolpenbank was listed as missing on 18 October while patrolling in poor weather near a mined area north of Schiermonnikoog in the North Sea. While the area was checked once the weather was cleared and no deliberately laid mines were found, it is possible the ship was sunk by a "drifter" which had broken loose and floated away due to the poor weather. It is also possible that the Skolpenbank simply succumbed to the bad weather, though this is unlikely because the ship was designed to operate in the North Sea.

The sinking of Skolpenbank and the uncertainty regarding the location and condition of its wreck led the Seekriegsleitung (Maritime Warfare Command) to order that no unnecessary classified information should be carried aboard patrolling vessels, since there was always a possibility that they could be wrecked in shallow water and boarded by enemy forces in search of intelligence.

References 

World War II auxiliary ships of Germany
Maritime incidents in October 1939
1930 ships